Italy competed at the 2013 Summer Universiade in Kazan, Russia.

The team won 44 medals (5th place after Russia, Japan, China, Ukraine) including 6 gold medals (9th place).

Sports

Athletics

The FIDAL (Italian athletics federation) brought 18 athletes at the Summer Universiade in Kazan (7 men and 8 women).

Football
Head coach:  Valerio Bertotto

References

External links
 Universiade (World University Games)
 WORLD STUDENT GAMES (UNIVERSIADE - MEN)
 WORLD STUDENT GAMES (UNIVERSIADE - WOMEN)

Summer U
2013
Nations at the 2013 Summer Universiade